Liternum was an ancient town of Campania, southern central Italy, near "Patria lake", on the low sandy coast between Cumae and the mouth of the Volturnus. It was probably once dependent on Cumae. In 194 BC it became a Roman colony. Although Livy records that the town was unsuccessful, excavation reveals a Roman town existed there until the 4th century AD.

History 
The town is mainly famous as the residence of the elder Scipio Africanus, who withdrew from Rome and died there. His tomb and villa are described by Seneca the Younger in his Moral Letters to Lucilius. In letter LXXXVI, Seneca describes the villa as being built with squared stone blocks with towers on both sides. 

In Ovid's Metamorphoses Liternum is mentioned for its mastic trees: lentisciferum... Liternum. Augustus Caesar is said to have conducted a colony of veterans to Liternum.
 
The construction of the Via Domitiana through Liternum made it a posting station, but the town later had a malaria outbreak and went into decline. In 455, the town was pillaged and destroyed by Genseric, king of the Vandals.

Excavations between 1930 and 1936 brought to light some elements of the city center (forum with a temple, a basilica and a small theater) dating from the beginning of the Roman Empire. Outside the city walls, the remains of the amphitheater and the necropolis have been identified.

References

Sources and external links 

 The Hunterian Museum's page on Liternum, with maps and photos.

Coloniae (Roman)
Roman sites of Campania
Giugliano in Campania
Former populated places in Italy
Archaeological sites in Campania
Phlegraean Fields